The Sac-Joaquin Section (SJS) is the governing body of public and private high school athletics in parts of Northern San Joaquin Valley, California. Its geographic area also covers the California portion of the Lake Tahoe region; however, three schools in that area—North Tahoe, Truckee, and South Tahoe High Schools—are instead members of the Nevada Interscholastic Activities Association due to their relative isolation from other California schools and their proximity to more populated areas in Nevada, especially in the Reno area. It is one of ten sections that compose the California Interscholastic Federation (CIF). The SJS is split into seven divisions, each comprising several leagues.

Section structure
The section is governed by a board of managers, whose voting members include representatives from member leagues, superintendents, school board associations and private schools. There are 174 member schools, assigned to leagues or conferences according to NCS Alignment and Classification Bylaws developed by the schools.

Divisions and conferences

Division I

Delta League (Delta)
Cosumnes Oaks
Davis Sr.
Elk Grove
Franklin (EG)
Jesuit (Boys Only)
Pleasant Grove
Sheldon
St. Francis (Girls Only)

Sierra Foothill League (SFL)
Del Oro
Folsom
Granite Bay
Oak Ridge
Rocklin
Whitney

Tri-City Athletic League (TCAL)
Lincoln (S)
Lodi
Modesto Christian (BKB Only)
St. Mary's
Tokay
Tracy
West

Division II

Capital Valley Conference (CVC)

Antelope
Bella Vista
Inderkum
Roseville
River Valley
Woodcreek
Yuba City

Metropolitan Conference (Metro)
 Burbank
Grant 
 Kennedy
 Laguna Creek
 McClatchy
Monterey Trail
River City

Central California Athletic League (CCAL)
Downey
Enochs
Gregori
Modesto
Pitman
Turlock

San Joaquin Athletic Association (SJAA)

Bear Creek
Chavez
Edison
Franklin (S)
Linden
McNair
Stagg
Weston Ranch

Division III

Capital Athletic League (CAL)

Capital Christian
Christian Brothers
Del Campo
El Camino
Rio Americano
Sacramento
Vista del Lago

Central California Conference (CCC)

Atwater
Buhach Colony
Central Valley
El Capitan
Golden Valley
Merced
Patterson

Foothill Valley League (FVL)

Lincoln (L)
Nevada Union
Oakmont
Placer
Ponderosa
West Park

Monticello Empire League (MEL)

Armijo
Fairfield
Rodriguez
Vacaville
Vanden
Wood

Valley Oak League (VOL)

Central Catholic
East Union
Kimball
Manteca
Oakdale
Sierra
River Islands (Frosh Only)

Division IV

Golden Empire League (GEL)
Casa Roble
Dixon
Mesa Verde
Mira Loma
Pioneer
Rio Linda
Woodland

Greater Sacramento League (GSL)
Cordova
 Florin
Foothill
 Johnson
 Natomas
 Valley
West Campus

Western Athletic Conference (WAC)
Beyer
Ceres
Grace Davis
Johansen
Lathrop
Los Banos
Mountain House
Pacheco

Division V

Mother Lode League (MLL)
Amador
Argonaut
Bret Harte
Calaveras
Sonora
Summerville

Pioneer Valley League (PVL)

Bear River
Center
Colfax
Lindhurst
Marysville
Sutter
Twelve Bridges
Wheatland

Sierra Valley Conference (SVC)

Bradshaw Christian
El Dorado
Galt
Liberty Ranch
Rosemont
Union Mine

Trans Valley League (TVL)
Escalon
Hilmar
Hughson
Livingston
Modesto Christian (No BKB)
Ripon
Ripon Christian (BKB Only)
Riverbank

Division VI

Sierra Delta League (SDL)
Esparto
Golden Sierra
Highlands
Rio Vista
San Juan
Vacaville Christian

Southern Athletic League (SAL)
Delhi
Denair
Gustine
Le Grand
Mariposa
Orestimba
Ripon Christian (No BKB)
Waterford

Division VII

Central California Athletic Alliance (CCAA)
Big Valley Christian
Jim Elliot Christian
Millennium
Stone Ridge Christian
Venture Academy

Central Valley California League (CVCL)
Delta
Encina
Forest Lake Christian
Foresthill
Futures
Sacramento Waldorf
Victory Christian
Woodland Christian

Mountain Valley League (MVL)
ABLE Charter
Delta Charter
Don Pedro
Holt Academy
Hughes Academy
Lodi Academy
Stockton Christian
Tioga

Northern Pacific Athletic Conference (NPAC)
Fortune Early College
John Adams Academy
Leroy Greene Academy
New Life Christian
Trinity Prep

Sacramento Metro Athletic League (SMAL)
Buckingham Charter
Cristo Rey
Faith Christian
Sacramento Adventist
Sacramento Country Day
Valley Christian
Western Sierra
Wilton Christian

Div. VII Football Conferences
Small school, football only division

Sacramento Metropolitan Athletic League (SMAL)
Delta
Encina
Foresthill
Valley Christian
Western Sierra

Central California Athletic Alliance (CCAA)
Big Valley Christian
Delta Charter
Millennium
Stone Ridge Christian

Section Championships
The following is a list of the top-10 schools in the section in order of team championships won:
 Davis Sr. (157)
 Jesuit (128)
 Rio Americano (101)
 St. Francis (99)
 Placer (86)
 Granite Bay (82)
 Vacaville (79)
 St. Mary's (78)
 Del Oro (72) 
 Ponderosa (67)

References

External links
Official Site

California Interscholastic Federation sections